The 1965 Texas Longhorns baseball team represented the University of Texas at Austin in the 1965 NCAA University Division baseball season. The Longhorns played their home games at Clark Field. The team was coached by Bibb Falk in his 23rd season at Texas.

The Longhorns reached the College World Series, finishing tied for seventh with losses to Washington State and Florida State.

Personnel

Roster

Schedule and results

References

Texas Longhorns baseball seasons
Texas Longhorns
Southwest Conference baseball champion seasons
College World Series seasons
Texas Longhorns